Roseomonas gilardii is a species of Gram negative, strictly aerobic, coccobacilli-shaped, pink-pigmented bacterium. It is the type species of the genus Roseomonas. The new species was among the first Roseomonas species proposed in 1993, and is named for "Gerald L. Gilardi for his many contributions to bacteriology and, specifically, for his contributions in the area of glucose-nonfermenting
gram-negative rods." R. gilardii is pathogenic for humans, causing bacteremia and other infections.

There are two subspecies of R. gilardii: R. g. subsp. gilardii and R. g. subsp. rosea.

References

External links
Type strain of Roseomonas gilardii at BacDive -  the Bacterial Diversity Metadatabase

Rhodospirillales
Bacteria described in 1993